The Biopharmaceutics Classification System is a system to differentiate the drugs on the basis of their solubility and permeability.

This system restricts the prediction using the parameters solubility and intestinal permeability. The solubility classification is based on a United States Pharmacopoeia (USP) aperture. The intestinal permeability classification is based on a comparison to the intravenous injection. All those factors are highly important because 85% of the most sold drugs in the United States and Europe are orally administered .

BCS classes 

According to the Biopharmaceutical Classification System (BCS) drug substances are classified to four classes upon their solubility and permeability:

Class I - high permeability, high solubility 
 Example: metoprolol, paracetamol
 Those compounds are well absorbed and their absorption rate is usually higher than excretion.
Class II - high permeability, low solubility 
 Example: glibenclamide, bicalutamide, ezetimibe, aceclofenac
 The bioavailability of those products is limited by their solvation rate. A correlation between the in vivo bioavailability and the in vitro solvation can be found.
Class III - low permeability, high solubility 
 Example: cimetidine
 The absorption is limited by the permeation rate but the drug is solvated very fast. If the formulation does not change the permeability or gastro-intestinal duration time, then class I criteria can be applied.
Class IV - low permeability, low solubility 
 Example: Bifonazole
 Those compounds have a poor bioavailability. Usually they are not well absorbed over the intestinal mucosa and a high variability is expected.

Definitions

The drugs are classified in BCS on the basis of solubility, permeability, and dissolution.

Solubility class boundaries are based on the highest dose strength of an immediate release product. A drug is considered highly soluble when the highest dose strength is soluble in 250 ml or less of aqueous media over the pH range of 1 to 7.5. The volume estimate of 250 ml is derived from typical bioequivalence study protocols that prescribe administration of a drug product to fasting human volunteers with a glass of water.

Permeability class boundaries are based indirectly on the extent of absorption of a drug substance in humans and directly on the measurement of rates of mass transfer across human intestinal membrane. Alternatively non-human systems capable of predicting drug absorption in humans can be used (such as in-vitro culture methods).  A drug substance is considered highly permeable when the extent of absorption in humans is determined to be 90% or more of the administered dose based on a mass-balance determination or in comparison to an intravenous dose.

For dissolution class boundaries, an immediate release product is considered rapidly dissolving when no less than 85% of the labeled amount of the drug substance dissolves within 15 minutes using USP Dissolution Apparatus 1 at 100 RPM or Apparatus 2 at 50 RPM in a volume of 900 ml or less in the following media: 0.1 M HCl or simulated gastric fluid or pH 4.5 buffer and pH 6.8 buffer or simulated intestinal fluid.

See also
ADME
Partition coefficient
Bioavailability
Drug metabolism
First pass effect
Polar surface area
IVIVC

References

Further reading

External links
 BCS guidance of the U.S. Food and Drug Administration

Pharmacological classification systems
Pharmacy in the United States